Volker D. Burkert is a German physicist, academic and researcher. He is a Principal Staff Scientist at the Thomas Jefferson National Accelerator Facility at Jefferson Lab (JLab) in Newport News, Virginia (USA). He has made major contributions to the design of the CEBAF Large Acceptance Spectrometer (CLAS) that made it suitable for high luminosity operation in experiments studying spin-polarized electron scattering.

Beginning in 2002, Burkert developed the concept of a new large acceptance detector, CLAS12, tuned for the much higher rate capabilities that were needed to take full advantage of the doubling of the energy of the CEBAF machine to 12 GeV. CLAS12 has been in operation since 2018. Burkert's work contributed to JLab's flagship program investigating the three-dimensional structure of the proton.

Burkert is a Fellow of the American Physical Society, and the recipient of the 2019 Virginia Governor's Outstanding Scientist award.

Education
Burkert was educated at the University of Bonn in Germany, earning a BA in 1967, a master's degree in physics in 1969 and a PhD in 1975. After being awarded his doctorate, he continued to study in Bonn until 1981.

Career
Burkert began his career as a research associate at Bonn University in 1975. In 1978, he was promoted to the German equivalent of an assistant professorship, a position that he held until 1984. During this time he was also on leave as a Scientific Associate at the European Council for Nuclear Research (CERN) in Switzerland, where he joined the Axial Field Spectrometer (AFS) team at the proton-proton Intersecting Storage Rings (ISR). Following a sabbatical in the US in 1984, he joined the Continuous Electron Beam Accelerator Facility (CEBAF) in 1985 as a Staff Scientist, and worked on the development of instrumentation for nuclear physics experiments in two of the three planned experimental halls.

In 1992, Burkert was promoted to the rank of Senior Staff Scientist and developed a broad research program to elucidate the internal structure of nucleons by investigating their excited states and so assisting theorists in their development of their quark models. Similar work was undertaken in research centers across Europe and Asia. In 2003, he took charge of the experimental department Hall B and the scientific research group, and led a team of scientists, engineers, and technicians in the pursuit of a high impact scientific program that explores the internal quark and gluon structure of protons, neutrons and atomic nuclei. During this time, Burkert developed the conceptual design of a new spectrometer system, CLAS12, with an order of magnitude increase in operating luminosity over the original CLAS detector performance. He oversaw the design, construction and commissioning of the CLAS12 spectrometer system and ancillary equipment.

Research
Burkert has authored and co-authored over 500 scientific articles and has over 56,000 citations. In his early years of research, he studied nucleon excitations involving high energy polarized electron beams and spin-polarized hydrogen and deuterium targets. At the Bonn University electron accelerator, Burkert developed an electron-spin polarimeter to map the energy and strengths of several depolarizing resonances induced in the electron beam during the acceleration process in the synchrotron. The results enabled designing compensating measures to keep the polarization value high during the acceleration process as required for scientific experiments.

Burkert's research at CERN focused on hard scattering processes employing two colliding proton beams each with beam energies up to 31 GeV. This led to the first direct determination of the gluon structure function of the proton. At Jefferson Lab (CEBAF), Burkert led a research program focused on the experimental study of the structure of protons, neutrons and nuclei using high energy electron and photon beams, polarized hydrogen and deuterium targets and the CLAS detector system, suitably instrumented for high rate operation in intense electron beams. This opened up a high-impact scientific program of exclusive electron scattering measurements, where all particles generated in the interaction are detected and identified in CLAS. The required detector modifications enabled the discovery of the theoretically predicted deeply virtual Compton scattering (DVCS) process, which provided the basis for an extensive program to construct 3D images of the proton's internal quark distribution as well their internal mechanical properties. These modifications were also critical for measurements that clarified the internal structure of a series of excited states of the proton as part of the NSTAR program.

Nuclear and particle physics
Burkert has made major contributions to the design, construction and performance of CLAS. The work on pressure distribution inside the proton provides insights into the strong interaction mechanisms internal to subatomic particles, and the cause of the extremely high pressure observed in protons for the first time. It further introduced a new area of research on the fundamental gravitational and mechanical properties of protons, neutrons and nuclei, which can provide access to the normal and shear stress inside subatomic particles, and their physical radii. The results of this research through an extraction of the Compton Form Factors reveal a tomographic image of the nucleon. This result is based on prior measurements of the differential cross sections and of the beam spin asymmetries in the hard exclusive electroproduction of photons on the proton over a wide kinematic range and with high statistical precision.

Burkert reviewed  the experimental findings in a large number of experiments in 2003-2004 had found evidence of the existence of an exotic baryon Ɵ+(1535) consisting of four quarks and one anti-quark, generated in photoproduction processes, e.g. on deuterium ɣd→K-(K+n)p as well as more massive states. Such exotic states would have quantum numbers that cannot be formed from only the 3 quarks present in nucleons or other baryons, but require combinations of four quarks and one anti-quark. He found that the experimental evidence for the Θ+(1535) state had significantly eroded with new precision data, and left only room for a hypothetical baryon state in the (K+n) system with a very narrow intrinsic energy-width of less than 500 KeV, rendering the existence of such a state highly unlikely. 
 
Reviews of the progress in the investigation of the electroexcitation of the excited nucleon resonances, both in experiment and in theory, highlight the transition amplitudes of the four lowest excited states. These results show that the standard quark model of 3 valence quarks, consisting of up-quarks and down-quarks only, cannot explain the resonance transition amplitudes at small photon virtuality. Higher Fock states, including meson-baryon contributions, must be included. These results led the way towards resolving a longstanding controversy about the Roper resonance, the lowest mass radial excitation of the ground state nucleon. Its transition amplitudes strongly deviate from the quark model predictions when probed at large distances that led to invoking more exotic interpretations of the resonance as a hybrid excitation with gluons as structural parts of the wave function, and as a dynamically meson-baryon excitation.  This has been discussed in Progress in Nuclear and Particle Physics, and in the Review of Modern Physics. Similar but smaller effects were also found for other excited states, Δ(1232)3/2+, N(1520)3/2−, and N(1535)1/2-, and indicates that this may be a fundamental contribution to resonance excitations in electromagnetic interactions.

Awards and honors
2004 - Fellow, American Physical Society – Division Nuclear Physics
2013 - Member, Particle Data Group (PDG), Section Unstable Baryons
2019 - Outstanding Scientist Award, Governor of Virginia
2021 - Outstanding Achievements in Nuclear and Particle Physics, MARQUIS Who's Who,

Bibliography
The CEBAF large acceptance spectrometer (CLAS). Nuclear Instruments and Methods in Physics Research Section A: Accelerators, Spectrometers, Detectors and Associated Equipment, 503(3), 513–553.
N* Physics and Nonperturbative Quantum Chromodynamics, S. Simula, B. Saghai, V.D. Burkert, N. C. Mukhopadhyay (eds.), Published 1999, Springer ISBN 978-3-211-83299-8.
Excited Nucleons and Hadronic Structure, Proceedings of the NSTAR 2000 Conference, 16–19 February 2000, Newport News, USA. World Scientific Publishing Co. Pte. Ltd., Burkert V. D., Elouadrhiri L., Kelly J. J., Minehart R. C., (eds),
Electromagnetic Interactions and Hadronic Structure, F. Close, S. Donnachie, G. Shaw (eds), Cambridge Monographs on Particle Physics, Nuclear Physics and Cosmology, August 2009
The 8th International Workshop on the Physics of Excited Nucleons, Newport News, Virginia, USA 17–20 May 2011, AIP Conference Proceedings, Melville, New York, 2012, Burkert, V. D., Jones, M., Pennington, M., Richards, D. (eds).
12th International Conference on Meson-Nucleon Physics and the Structure of the Nucleon, AIP Conference Proceedings/High Energy Physics), D. Armstrong, V. Burkert, W. Detmold, J. Dudek, J.P. Chen, W. Melnitchouk, D. Richards (eds.), 2011. ISBN 9780735409347.
Particle Data Group, Tanabashi, M., et al., Review of particle physics. Physical Review D, 98(3), 030001 (2018).
Roper resonance: Toward a solution to the 50 years puzzle. Reviews of Modern Physics, 91(1), 011003.
Particle Data Group, Zyla, P. et al., Review of particle physics. Progress of Theoretical and Experimental Physics, 2020(8), 083C01.
The CLAS12 spectrometer at Jefferson laboratory. Nuclear Instruments and Methods in Physics Research Section A: Accelerators, Spectrometers, Detectors and Associated Equipment, 959, 163419 (2020).

References 

Living people
Year of birth missing (living people)
Place of birth missing (living people)
University of Bonn alumni
21st-century German physicists
Fellows of the American Physical Society
People associated with CERN